Events in the year 1930 in the British Mandate of Palestine.

Incumbents
 High Commissioner - Sir John Chancellor
 Emir of Transjordan - Abdullah I bin al-Hussein
 Prime Minister of Transjordan - Hasan Khalid Abu al-Huda

Events

 5 January - The left-wing political party Mapai is founded by the merger of the Hapoel Hatzair (founded by A. D. Gordon) and the original Ahdut HaAvoda (founded in 1919 from the more moderate, right-wing of the Marxist Zionist socialist Russian party Poale Zion, led by David Ben-Gurion).
 17 June - 3 Arab Palestinians hanged for their part in the August 1929 riots. 25 other prisoners, two of them Jewish, had their death sentences commuted. The day was remembered by Palestinians as "Red Tuesday".
 1 October - Lord Passfield, the Secretary of State for the Colonies, issues a white paper, a formal statement of the British policy in Palestine, with a decidedly anti-Zionist tone, and which Zionists claim backtrack on British commitments in the Balfour Declaration.
 21 October - The Hope Simpson Royal Commission publishes the Hope Simpson Report, following the widespread 1929 Palestine riots, which recommends limiting Jewish immigration, claiming a lack of agricultural land to support such immigration.

Unknown dates
 The founding of the kibbutz Na'an by 42 members of the Noar HaOved youth group, on lands purchased from the Arabic village Al-Na'ani.

Births
 7 February - David Bar-Ilan, Israeli pianist, author, political spokesman, and columnist (died 2003).
 15 March - Edna Solodar, Israeli politician.
 April - Yaëla Hertz, Israeli-Canadian teacher (died 2014)
 5 April - Dov Lando, Israeli rabbi
 19 April - Yardena Alotin, Israeli composer and pianist (died 1994).
 2 May - Yoram Kaniuk, Israeli writer, painter, journalist, and theater critic (died 2013).
 6 May - Mordechai Gur, Israeli general and politician, tenth Chief of Staff of the IDF (died 1995).
 5 June - Reuven Adiv, Israeli actor, director, and drama teacher, head of acting at the Drama Centre London (2004).
 13 July - Naomi Shemer, leading Israeli songwriter and composer (died 2004).
 15 August - Emmanuel Shaked, Israeli general (died 2018).
 23 August - Yair Tzaban, Israeli politician and academic.
 1 September - Ora Namir, Israeli politician and diplomat (died 2019).
 11 October – Zev Buffman, theatre producer, President and CEO of Ruth Eckerd Hall (died 2020).
 3 November - Shalom Cohen, Israeli rabbi (died 2022)
 7 December - Dani Karavan, Israeli sculptor and painter (died 2021) .
 10 December - Muhammad Youssef al-Najjar, Palestinian Arab militant and leader of Black September (died 1973).
 22 December - Amnon Kapeliouk, Israeli journalist and author (died 2009).
 Full date unknown
 Gad Avigad, Israeli biochemist.
 Yoel Alroy, Israeli footballer and politician.
 Amnon Yariv, Israeli-American applied physicist and electrical engineer

Deaths
 17 June - Fuad Hijazi. Acre Prison.
 17 June - Ata El-Zeer. Acre Prison.
 17 June - Mohammad Khaleel Jamjoum. Acre Prison.

References

 
Years in Mandatory Palestine